Simon Špilak (born 23 June 1986) is a retired Slovenian professional road bicycle racer.

Professional career
Born in Tišina, Špilak was the winner of the 2010 Tour de Romandie, after original race winner Alejandro Valverde had his results expunged as part of a doping suspension. Špilak went on to gain second place in that race in 2013 and 2014, both times behind Chris Froome. In 2013, he was the victor of the GP Miguel Induráin and the Eschborn–Frankfurt City Loop, his only two victories of the year. In 2015, he won the general classification of the Tour de Suisse with only five seconds of an advantage over Geraint Thomas. The victory was decided on the last day's time trial. Špilak was considered a rarity in road cycling in that he is a general classification rider who targets one-week races rather than the three-week Grand Tours. In an interview he said that he disliked the heat, so he was always preparing for spring races instead of Grand Tours which took part mostly in summer.

In October 2019, Špilak announced his retirement after his  team folded.

Major results

2003
 10th Time trial, UCI Junior Road World Championships
2004
 National Junior Road Championships
1st  Road race
1st  Time trial
 3rd  Road race, UCI Junior Road World Championships
 4th Paris–Roubaix Juniors
2005
 1st  Road race, National Under-23 Road Championships
 7th GP Kranj
 9th Road race, UEC European Under-23 Road Championships
2006
 1st Poreč Trophy
 2nd Time trial, National Under-23 Road Championships
 5th Trofeo Zsšdi
 7th Time trial, UEC European Under-23 Road Championships
 7th Overall Istrian Spring Trophy
2007
 1st La Côte Picarde
 4th Overall Tour of Slovenia
1st  Young rider classification
 4th Overall Tour de l'Avenir
 5th Overall Istrian Spring Trophy
2008
 5th Overall Tour of Slovenia
 5th Overall Three Days of De Panne
 9th Tour of Flanders
2009
 1st Stage 3 Tour of Slovenia
 6th Overall Giro della Provincia di Grosseto
2010
 1st  Overall Tour de Romandie
1st  Young rider classification
1st Stage 4
 3rd Overall Bayern–Rundfahrt
2011
 5th Overall Tour of Slovenia
 5th Giro del Friuli
2012
 4th Overall Paris–Nice
 8th Overall Tour de Romandie
 8th Overall Tour of Belgium
 10th Overall Tour of the Basque Country
2013
 1st GP Miguel Induráin
 1st Eschborn–Frankfurt City Loop
 2nd Overall Tour de Romandie
1st Stage 4
 4th Overall Vuelta a Andalucía
 4th Overall Tour of the Basque Country
 6th Overall Paris–Nice
 9th Overall Tour de Suisse
 10th Overall Tour du Poitou-Charentes
2014
 1st Stage 5 Critérium du Dauphiné
 1st Stage 3 Arctic Race of Norway
 2nd Overall Tour de Romandie
1st Stage 3
 4th Overall Tour of the Basque Country
 8th Overall Paris–Nice
 9th Overall Volta ao Algarve
2015
 1st  Overall Tour de Suisse
 2nd Overall Tour de Romandie
 3rd Overall Paris–Nice
2016
 7th Overall Tour de Romandie
 8th Overall Tour of the Basque Country
 9th Overall Tour de Suisse
2017
 1st  Overall Tour de Suisse
1st Stage 7
 2nd Pro Ötztaler 5500
 10th Overall Tour of the Basque Country
2018
 6th Overall Tour de Suisse
 9th GP Miguel Induráin
2019
 5th Trofeo Serra de Tramuntana
 6th Overall Tour de Suisse
 6th Overall Tour of California
 9th Overall Tour de Romandie
 10th Overall Volta ao Algarve

Grand Tour general classification results timeline

Notes

References

External links

1986 births
Living people
People from Tišina
Slovenian male cyclists
Cyclists at the 2008 Summer Olympics
Cyclists at the 2016 Summer Olympics
Olympic cyclists of Slovenia
Tour de Suisse stage winners